Amjad Ahtesham Sayed (born 21 January 1961) was an Indian Judge. He is the former Chief Justice of Himachal Pradesh High Court and Judge of Bombay High Court.

Career 
He was born on 21 January 1961. He obtained a bachelor's degree in Law from Bombay University in the year 1984. He was elevated as an Additional Judge of Bombay High Court on 11 April 2007 and made Permanent Judge on 9 April 2007. He was appointed as Chief Justice of Himachal Pradesh High Court on 23 June 2022. He was retired on 20 January 2023.

References 

 

Indian judges
1961 births
Living people